The Best Pair of Legs in the Business is a 1973 British comedy-drama film directed by Christopher Hodson starring Reg Varney, Diana Coupland and Lee Montague. A comic/female impersonator at a holiday camp is concerned about the future. However he manages to secure both a job and a wife.

The film is a cinematic version of an episode of ITV Playhouse (Yorkshire Television) by the same writer and director and also starring Reg Varney, transmitted on 28 December 1968.

Plot

Sherry Sheridan's career is dying. He is tolerated rather than valued at the holiday camp. His wife Mary is having an affair with the outgoing camp manager who tries to persuade her to leave with him. Every time she is about to, something happens to prevent it.

Sherry's agent drops him. He drinks heavily. The only people who show him any form of affection are two girls who prefer him to two randy boys.

His estranged son Alan turns up in an attempt to heal relations. He invites his father to meet his fiancée and her parents including the father who is a vicar. Sherry attempts to puff himself up as a big shot entertainer who knows the Queen. Having disgraced himself, he goes back to the holiday camp alone.

The two jilted boys find Sherry peeping into the caravan window of the two girls, who are undressing. They throw him in the swimming pool where he protests that he cannot swim. He is rescued by his son. In a final reconciliation scene, the son explains that the critical comment about having the best legs in the business was actually a compliment after a friend protested that he was embarrassed by his own father's legs in a knobbly knees competition.

Cast
 Reg Varney - Sherry Sheridan
 Diana Coupland - Mary Sheridan
 Lee Montague - Charlie Green
 Jean Harvey - Emma Cooper
 David Lincoln - Ron
 George Sweeney - Dai
 Clare Sutcliffe - Glad
 Penny Spencer - Eunice
 Michael Hadley - Alan Sheridan
 Bill Dean - Bert
 Reginald Marsh - Fred
 Karen Kessey - May
 Johnny Briggs - Millet
 Geoffrey Chater - Rev. Thorn
 Clare Kelly - Mrs. Thorn
 Jane Seymour - Kim Thorn
 Jenny Thompson - Edna Pilbeam
 Claire Davenport - Eating Lady
 Claire Shenstone - 1st Chemist
 Jane Cardew - 2nd Chemist
 Preston Lockwood - 3rd Chemist

Production
The film was shot at EMI-MGM Elstree Studios, Borehamwood, Hertfordshire, and on location in Hertfordshire and West Sussex. The holiday camp location was Riverside Caravan Centre in Bognor Regis.

References

External links

1973 films
1973 comedy-drama films
Films shot at EMI-Elstree Studios
British comedy-drama films
1970s English-language films
1970s British films